James L. Easton (born July 26, 1935) is an American businessman, archer and philanthropist. He serves as the chairman, chief executive officer and President of BRG Sports. He was the President of the World Archery Federation from 1989 to 2005, and he has been a member of the International Olympic Committee since 1994.

Early life
James L. Easton was born on July 26, 1935. His father, James D. Easton, was a businessman and archer.

Easton graduated from the University of California, Los Angeles, with a bachelor of science in engineering in 1959.

Business career
Easton worked for the Douglas Aircraft Company from 1959 to 1964.

In the late 1960s, Easton joined his father's company, Jas. D. Easton, where they, along with brother Bob Easton, developed the first aluminum ski poles, followed by the first aluminum baseball bats. Both sports equipment items had previously been wooden. In the same manner, they developed aluminum hockey sticks instead of the traditional wooden sticks in the 1980s. Easton has served as the chairman, chief executive officer and President of Jas. D. Easton since 1973.

Easton served on the board of directors of Ambassadors Group from 2001 to 2006.

Archery
Easton served as the President of the World Archery Federation from 1989 to 2005. He was inducted into the Archery Hall of Fame in 1997.

Easton has been a member of the International Olympic Committee since 1994.

Philanthropy
Easton serves as the Chairman of the Easton Foundations, a family philanthropic foundation.

Easton was appointed to the board of trustees of the UCLA Foundation in 1985. He was awarded the UCLA Medal in 2014. He serves on the Board of Visitors of the UCLA Anderson School of Management. In 2015, he donated US$11 million to endow the Easton Technology Management Center at Anderson.

Personal life
Easton has a wife, Phyllis.

References

1935 births
Living people
UCLA Henry Samueli School of Engineering and Applied Science alumni
American corporate directors
American male archers
International Olympic Committee members